William Henry Hutchings, D.D. (1835 in Exeter – 1912 in Pickering) was an Anglican priest, author and translator.

Hutchings was educated at Hertford College, Oxford; and ordained in 1859. After a curacy in Bedminster he was warden at the House of Mercy, Clewer. He then became Rector of Kirby Misperton, Yorkshire, and in 1884 he became rector of Pickering. He was archdeacon of Cleveland from 1897 to 1906.

He died on 7 January 1912.

References

Clergy from Exeter
1835 births
1912 deaths
Alumni of Hertford College, Oxford
Archdeacons of Cleveland
Diocese of York